Pravuil, also known as Vretil, is an archangel briefly mentioned in the Second Book of Enoch as God's scribe and recordkeeper.  In Enoch II, God commands Pravuil to bring Enoch writing materials so he could document his journey through the heavens.  Charles Russell Coulter and Patricia Turner argue that Pravuil is a Hebrew recasting of the Mesopotamian deity Nabu.

See also
 List of angels in theology

References 

Angels in the Book of Enoch